The Icelandic football league system is a series of interconnected leagues for club football in Iceland.  a fifth level was added to the previous men's format of four levels.  there are 79 participating men's teams and 27 women's teams in the football league.

The system

Below shows how the current system, works. For each division, its official name and number of clubs is given. Each division promotes to the division(s) that lie directly above them and relegates to the division(s) that lie directly below them.

Men's leagues

4. deild karla playoffs
Only two teams are promoted from the fifth-tier 4. deild karla. The top two teams from each group play in a knock-out competition (played home and away) with the final being one match determining the 4. deild champions. Both finalists are promoted to 3. deild karla. The two teams relegated from 3. deild take a place in 4. deild, in one of four groups. The groups can change from year to year based on the number of teams. Football Association of Iceland attempts to distribute the teams evenly between groups.

Cup competitions

Clubs at all five levels are eligible for cup competitions.

Bikarkeppni KSÍ (Icelandic cup)
Deildarbikar karla (League cup)
Meistarakeppni karla (Men's Super Cup)

Women's leagues

Cup competitions
Bikarkeppni KSÍ (Icelandic cup)
Deildabikar kvenna (League cup)
Meistarakeppni kvenna ''(Women's  super cup)

References

External links
Icelandic FA
 League321.com - Icelandic football league tables, records & statistics database.
 IcelandFootball.net - Statistical database 

Iceland
Football leagues in Iceland